Arthroleptis poecilonotus (common names: West African screeching frog, mottled squeaker) is a species of frog in the family Arthroleptidae.  This adaptable species has a wide range within the Sub-Saharan Africa and is not considered threatened.

Distribution and taxonomy
Arthroleptis poecilonotus is widely distributed in the West African forest belt from Guinea-Bissau to Gabon, north-central Central African Republic, the Republic of the Congo, northern Democratic Republic of the Congo and extreme western Uganda, possibly as far as South Sudan. It is also present on Bioko. The IUCN SSC Amphibian Specialist Group lists the following countries: Benin, Cameroon, Republic of the Congo, Democratic Republic of the Congo, Ivory Coast, Equatorial Guinea, Gabon, Ghana, Guinea, Guinea-Bissau, Liberia, Nigeria, Uganda, South Sudan, and Togo. There are no records from Sierra Leone, although the species is likely to be present there. The taxonomic status of the nominal species is problematic, with one species (or more) representing western parts of its range, and another one in the eastern parts. Arthroleptis bivittatus and Arthroleptis zimmeri are possibly junior synonyms of this species.

Description
Males measure  and females  in snout–vent length.

Habitat
Arthroleptis poecilonotus inhabits secondary herbaceous growth in the forest zone. It also occurs in clearings and along forest tracks, and in towns and villages.

Ecology
Arthroleptis poecilonotus breeds away from water-bodies, laying its eggs on the ground where the developing larvae undergo direct development into juvenile frogs.

Status
Arthroleptis poecilonotus is a common species facing no particular threats. It has a wide distribution and is presumed to have a large total population. It is present in some protected areas, and the International Union for Conservation of Nature has assessed its conservation status as "least concern".

References

poecilonotus
Frogs of Africa
Amphibians of West Africa
Fauna of Benin
Amphibians of Cameroon
Amphibians of the Central African Republic
Amphibians of the Democratic Republic of the Congo
Amphibians of Equatorial Guinea
Amphibians of Gabon
Fauna of Ghana
Fauna of Guinea
Fauna of Ivory Coast
Fauna of Liberia
Fauna of Nigeria
Amphibians of the Republic of the Congo
Vertebrates of South Sudan
Fauna of Togo
Amphibians of Uganda
Amphibians described in 1863
Taxa named by Wilhelm Peters
Taxonomy articles created by Polbot